500 Degreez is the third studio album by American rapper Lil Wayne. It was released on July 23, 2002, by Cash Money Records and Universal Records. The album's title was inspired by the album 400 Degreez (1998), by fellow rapper and label-mate Juvenile.

Commercial performance
500 Degreez debuted at number six on the US Billboard 200 chart, selling 141,000 copies in the first week. This became Wayne's second US top-ten debut. The album also debuted at number one on the US Top R&B/Hip-Hop Albums chart, becoming Wayne's second number-one album on that chart. In its second week, the album dropped to number ten on the chart. As of September 3, 2002, the album was certified gold by the Recording Industry Association of America (RIAA) for sales of over 500,000 copies in the United States.

Track listing
All songs produced by Mannie Fresh.

Charts

Weekly charts

Year-end charts

Certifications

References

2002 albums
Lil Wayne albums
Cash Money Records albums
Albums produced by Mannie Fresh